RumChata is a cream liqueur manufactured in Wisconsin. The recipe includes rum, dairy cream, cinnamon, vanilla, sugar, and other flavorings. The drink has been manufactured in Pewaukee, Wisconsin, since 2009. Its name is a portmanteau of rum and horchata; the liqueur was designed to taste like a mixture of the two. It contains 13.75% or 15% alcohol by volume, depending on where it is sold.

In the 2016 US market, RumChata ranked second in the cream liqueur category after Baileys Irish Cream.

See also
Horchata
Rum

References

Cream liqueurs
Products introduced in 2009
American alcoholic drinks
Waukesha County, Wisconsin
Cuisine of Wisconsin